Albino da Silva (born 9 January 1925) is a Portuguese former sports shooter. He competed in the 50 metre rifle, prone event at the 1960 Summer Olympics.

References

External links
  

1925 births
Possibly living people
Portuguese male sport shooters
Olympic shooters of Portugal
Shooters at the 1960 Summer Olympics
Sportspeople from Porto